Union Ridge School District 86 is a school district located in Harwood Heights, Illinois, United States.

References

External links
 

School districts in Cook County, Illinois